Egidyella is a genus of beetles in the family Dermestidae, containing the following species:

 Egidyella arcana Beal & Zhantiev, 2001 — California
 Egidyella prophetea Reitter, 1899 — Uzbekistan, Turkmenistan

References

Dermestidae